AdventHealth Orlando is the second largest hospital in Florida and the largest in Central Florida. AdventHealth Orlando is the 10th largest hospital in the United States in 2019. By Newsweek the best hospitals in the world in 2021 were Parker Adventist Hospital #131, AMITA Health Adventist Medical Center Hinsdale (know UChicago Medicine AdventHealth Hinsdale) #169, AdventHealth Orlando #171, Porter Adventist Hospital #201, AdventHealth Shawnee Mission #292, AMITA Health Adventist Medical Center La Grange (know UChicago AdventHealth La Grange) #298 The thirty-three best hospitals in Florida by U.S. News & World Report in 2022 were: AdventHealth Orlando #2, AdventHealth Daytona Beach #18 and AdventHealth Waterman #29. Leapfrog Group spring 2021 grades for hospitals in Florida: Grade "A" (*) and Grade "B" (**)

See also
List of hospitals in Florida

References

 
Medical and health organizations based in Florida
Hospital networks in the United States
Non-profit organizations based in Florida
Companies based in Seminole County, Florida
Adventist organizations established in the 20th century
Organizations established in 1973
1973 establishments in Florida
Seventh-day Adventist Church-related lists
AdventHealth hospitals